Now! is the third album by singer, France Joli, released in 1982. This album saw her shift away from the disco based songs of her early recordings, to a funkier soul music base. This change provided her with her biggest international hit, "Gonna Get Over You". It also includes the moderate dance chart hit, "Your Good Lovin'".

Track listings
"Your Good Lovin'"
"Gonna Get Over You"
"Can We Fall in Love Again"
"I Wanna Take a Chance on Love"
"Now"
"I'm Still Thinking of You"
"I Need Someone"
"Everlasting Love"
"Gonna Get Over You" (12" Mix)
"Gonna Get Over You" (Instrumental)
"Te Olvidare" (Gonna Get Over You) (Spanish version)

Personnel
Lead Vocal - France Joli
Backing Vocals – Fonzi Thornton (tracks: 1, 6), Dolette McDonald (tracks: 1, 6), Robin Clark (tracks: 1, 6)
Backing Vocals – Barbara Ingram (tracks: 2 to 5, 7, 8), Carla Benson (tracks: 2 to 5, 7, 8), Evette Benton (tracks: 2 to 5, 7, 8)
Bass – Arnold "Muki" Wilson, Fred Brown, Sandy Anderson
Drums – Buddy Williams, Raymond Rock, Ray "Johnny" Reid
Guitar – Dennis Weeden, Phil Hamilton, Ron Miller*, Steve Khan, William "Bubba" Anderson
Percussion – Errol "Crusher" Bennett, Sammy Figueroa, Steve Thornton
Acoustic Piano, Electric Piano – Galen "Lenny" Underwood
Backing Vocals produced by – Giuliano Salerni (tracks: 1, 6)
Producer – Darryl Payne (tracks: 1), Eric Matthew (tracks: 1)
Producer, Arranged By – Ray Reid (tracks: 2 to 8), William Anderson (tracks: 2 to 8)
Soloist, Tenor Saxophone – Dave Tofani
Prophet 5, Acoustic Piano, Electric Piano – Andy Schwartz
Prophet 5, Synthesizer – Clifford Branch Jr.
Rhythm & Vocal Arranged by – Ray Reid, William Anderson
Strings & Horns Arranged by – Giuliano Salerni

Credits
Production Coordinator – Gerry Kuster
Musical Contractor – Jeff Delinko
Engineer – John Potoker
Assistant Engineer – Glen Rosenstein, Joan Meisel, Linda Randazzo, Matthew Weiner
Mastered By – Herbie Jr.*
Mixed By – Gene Leone (tracks: 4 to 5, 7, 8)
Chair – George Kempler
Photography By, Art Direction – Trudy Schlachter
Clothing By – Andre Bailey
Hair & Make-up By – Rick Gillette
Jewelry By – Lu Willard

References

External links
Now by France Joli at Discogs
Now by France Joli at AllMusic

1982 albums
France Joli albums